The 1975 Czechoslovak presidential election took place on 29 May 1975. Gustáv Husák was elected the new president.

Background
The health of the incumbent president Ludvík Svoboda was getting worse and members of the Communist Party of Czechoslovakia concluded that he won't finish his second term. Vasil Bilak and Gustáv Husák were suggested for the position. Bilak had stronger support but Husák's influence increased thanks to Bilak's authoritarian behaviour.

References

Presidential
Gustáv Husák
1975
Single-candidate elections
Elections in Communist Czechoslovakia